The Gaon Digital Chart is a chart that ranks the best-performing singles in South Korea. Managed by the domestic Ministry of Culture, Sports and Tourism (MCST), its data is compiled by the Korea Music Content Industry Association and published by the Gaon Music Chart. The ranking is based collectively on each single's weekly download sales, stream count, and background music usage. In mid-2008, the Recording Industry Association of Korea ceased publishing music sales data. The MCST established a process to collect music sales in 2009, and began publicly publishing its data with the introduction of the Gaon Music Chart the following February. With the creation of the Gaon Digital Chart, digital data for individual songs was provided in the country for the first time.

In 2010, 35 singles claimed the top spot in 52 weeks of rankings. Gain and Jo Kwon's collaboration "We Fell in Love" became the first song to top the Digital Chart, doing so for three consecutive weeks. "Bad Girl Good Girl" by Miss A, the quartet's debut single, spent four consecutive weeks at number one on the Gaon Digital Chart. It went on to become the best-performing single of 2010, topping the year-end chart. Girls' Generation topped the chart with three different songs, more than any other act. On the monthly chart, Girls' Generation and IU had the most number-one singles, with two each. 2AM logged the most entries on the year-end chart, with five songs ranking in the top 100. "Can't Let You Go Even If I Die" was the most-downloaded song with 3,352,827 in sales.

Weekly chart

Monthly charts

References

External links
 Digital Chart at Gaon Music Chart 

2010 singles
Korea, South singles
2010 in South Korean music